Hélène Chanel (born Hélène Stoliaroff; 12 June 1941 in Deauville, Calvados, France) is a  French actress of Russian heritage.  She was active in the 1960s in a variety of European international co-productions of sword and sandal, Eurospy and Spaghetti Westerns.  She was credited with a variety of names such as Hélène Chancel, Helen Chanel,  Sheryll Morgan, Helen Stoliaroff and Hélène Stoliaroff.

Biography
A former model, Helene entered films in 1959 in the film Les dragueurs opposite Ugo Tognazzi. Her surname was to have been changed to "Chancel", but an Italian publicity agent misspelled it to "Chanel".

Partial filmography

 Les Dragueurs (1959) - Une invitée à la surboum
 Détournement de mineures (1959) - Christine
 Genitori in blue-jeans (1960) - Nuri
 My Friend, Dr. Jekyll (1960) - Rossana
 Le olimpiadi dei mariti (1960) - Elke
 Un dollaro di fifa (1960) - Alice Perkins
 Tu che ne dici? (1960) - Stella
 La ragazza sotto il lenzuolo (1961) - Dolly
 5 marines per 100 ragazze (1961) - Elena, la maestra
 Samson and the Seven Miracles of the World (1961) - Liu Tai
 Gerarchi si muore (1961) - Italia
 The Witch's Curse (1962) - Fania
 Colpo gobbo all'italiana (1962) - French Blond Tourist
 La monaca di Monza (1962) - Caterina
 Passport for a Corpse (1962) - Hélène
 I tre nemici (1962) - Jacqueline
 Avventura al motel (1963) - Madame de Sèvres
 La donna degli altri è sempre più bella (1963) - Donna Rossana (segment "La luna di miele")
 The Invincible Masked Rider (1963) - Carmencita
 Slave Girls of Sheba (1963) - Rosalana
 Two Mafiamen in the Far West (1964) - Betty Blanc
 Desert Raiders (1964) - Zaira
 Hercules of the Desert (1964) - Farida
 Samson and the Mighty Challenge (1964)
 Conqueror of Atlantis (1965) - Queen Ming
 Night of Violence (1965) - Carla Pratesi
 Operation Counterspy (1965) - Pat
 Ischia operazione amore (1966) - Beatrice Dinelli
 Agente segreto 777 - Invito ad uccidere (1966) - Jeanne Cartier
 Pleasant Nights (1966) - Violante (uncredited)
 Ring Around the World (1966) - Mary Brightford
 The Devil in Love (1966) - Clarice
 Killer Caliber .32 (1967) - Dolly
 El hombre de Caracas (1967)
 Cjamango (1967) - Pearl Hernandez
 2 RRRingos no Texas (1967) - Sentenza Jane
 Death Rides Along (1967) - Dolores Talbot
 Nel sole (1967) - Ivana Vannucci
 Criminal Affair (1968) - Georgette
 Un posto all'inferno (1969) - Betsy
 Gangster's Law (1969) - contessa Elena Villani
 Death Knocks Twice (1969) - Angela
 La ragazza del prete (1970)
 Edipeon (1970)
 Boccaccio (1972) - Principessa di Civigni
 Gli amici degli amici hanno saputo (1973)
 Lips of Lurid Blue (1975) - Elli's Mother
 Lo sgarbo (1975)
 Stangata in famiglia (1976)
 Il bocconcino (1976) - Michela
 Rudeness'' (1977) - Lady White (final film role)

References

External links
 

1941 births
Living people
People from Deauville
French people of Russian descent
French film actresses
Spaghetti Western actresses